Jag lyfter ögat mot himmelen is hymn with lyrics by Johan Ludvig Runeberg, 1857. It was introduced to the Finnish hymnals in 1886, using an 1883 translation. In Finnish, it's called "Mä silmät luon ylös taivaaseen". The hymn also appears twice in the Swedish hymnal of 1986.

The music used in the Finnish hymnals, and for the Finnish-language hymnals in Sweden, is composed by Rudolf Lagi in 1867. The Swedish hymnal of 1986 uses music composed by Oskar Lindberg in 1917. The hymn also appears twice in the Swedish hymnal of 1986.

Publication
Virsikirja 1886
Number 158 in Svensk söndagsskolsångbok 1908 under the lines "Böne- och lovsånger".
Number 162 in Lilla Psalmisten 1909 under the lines "Bönesånger".
Number 223 in Svensk söndagsskolsångbok 1929 under the lines "Barndoms- och ungdomstiden".
Number 515 in 1937 års psalmbok under the lines "Barn"
Number 477 in Virsikirja 1938
Number 486 in Finlandssvenska psalmboken 1943
Nu ska vi sjunga, 1943, under the lines "Andra vackra sånger och visor".
Number 678 in Frälsningsarméns sångbok 1968 under the lines "Barn och ungdom".
Number 490 in Virsikirja 1986
Number 492 in Finlandssvenska psalmboken 1986
Number 210 in Den svenska psalmboken 1986, 1986 års Cecilia-psalmbok, Psalmer och Sånger 1987, Segertoner 1988 and Frälsningsarméns sångbok 1990 under the lines "Bönen"
Number 647 in Den svenska psalmboken 1986, with two language-versions under the lines "Från Finland".

References

1886 songs
Finnish Christian hymns
19th-century hymns